Andrius Giedraitis (born July 23, 1973) is a Lithuanian former professional basketball player and coach.

Professional career
Giedraitis started his career in the LPA Vilnius team, and he later moved to BC Sakalai. In 1998, he became a member of BC Lietuvos Rytas. He was one of the leaders of that team. In 2001, he moved to Telindus Oostende. During the 2002–03 season, he played with Śląsk Wrocław, where he became one of the team's leaders (avergaing 11.6 points per game).

In 2003, he signed a contract with BC Lietuvos Rytas, however, due to an injury, he did not play. In 2004, he moved to BSG Basket Ludwigsburg, where he also immediately became one of the team's leaders. In 2005, he played with BC Dynamo Moscow Region. In 2007, he moved to Grupo Capitol Valladolid.

Coaching career
On August 12, 2010, Giedraitis became an assistant coach for Sakalai.

Career statistics

EuroLeague

|-
| style="text-align:left;"| 2001–02
| style="text-align:left;"| Telindus Oostende
| 14 || 13 || 27.2 || .521 || .529 || .884 || 3.5 || 1.6 || 1.1 || .2 || 13.6 || 16.0
|-
| style="text-align:left;"| 2002–03
| style="text-align:left;"| Śląsk Wrocław
| 14 || 8 || 25.2 || .618 || .552 || .825 || 2.4 || 1.8 || .9 || .0 || 13.1 || 14.3

References

External links
Eurobasket.com Profile

1973 births
Living people
Basketball players at the 2000 Summer Olympics
BC Rytas players
CB Valladolid players
Liga ACB players
Lithuanian expatriate basketball people in Germany
Lithuanian expatriate basketball people in Poland
Lithuanian expatriate basketball people in Russia
Lithuanian expatriate basketball people in Spain
Lithuanian men's basketball players
Medalists at the 2000 Summer Olympics
Olympic basketball players of Lithuania
Olympic bronze medalists for Lithuania
Olympic medalists in basketball
Sportspeople from Marijampolė
Lithuanian expatriate basketball people in Belgium
Shooting guards